Amazon One is a payment system offered by Amazon. It is based on biometrics and works by reading users' palm print. It is used by retailers like Whole Foods Market, Amazon Go and Amazon Go Grocery, as well as third-party retailers who purchased the technology from Amazon. 

In 2021, it rolled out a promotional offer which gave $10 to new users upon registering. The system is available in 53 stores as of 2021.

In August 2021, three US Senators (Amy Klobuchar, Bill Cassidy, Jon Ossoff) sent a letter to the Amazon's CEO Andy Jassy, questioning the safety of the Amazon One users concerning the biometrics and cloud storage.

References

External links
 How To Use Amazon One

Amazon (company)